Malhani is a constituency of the Uttar Pradesh Legislative Assembly covering the city of Malhani in the Jaunpur District of Uttar Pradesh, India.

Malhani is one of five Assembly constituencies in the Jaunpur Lok Sabha constituency. Since 2008, this Assembly constituency is numbered 367 amongst 403 constituencies.

Members of Legislative Assembly

Election results

2022

By-elections 2020

In the 2020 assembly by-election, Shri. Lucky Yadav, son of late Shri. Parasnath Yadav has won the MLA seat defeating Shri. Dhananjay Singh by the margin of around 4000 votes.

This seat was vacant since June 2020 due to the demise of former MLA Shri. Parasnath Yadav. Now this position has been taken by his son Shri. Lucky Yadav. Last Election Samajwadi Party candidate Parasnath Yadav won in 2017 Uttar Pradesh Legislative Elections defeating Nishad Party candidate Dhananjay Singh by a margin of 21,210 votes.

2017

References

External links
 

Assembly constituencies of Uttar Pradesh
Politics of Jaunpur district